Mixmaster may refer to:

Equipment and technology
 Sunbeam Mixmaster, an electric kitchen mixer that was the flagship product of Sunbeam Products
 Mix Diskerud, United States professional soccer player nicknamed after the mixer
 Mixmaster anonymous remailer, a Type II anonymous remailer network software
 Douglas XB-42 Mixmaster, a prototype American bomber
 A nickname for the Cessna Skymaster airplane

Music 
 Mixmaster Morris or Morris Gould (born 1965), English ambient DJ and underground musician
 Mix Master Mike (born 1970), American turntablist and contributing member of the Beastie Boys
 Mixmaster Spade, an early gangsta rap performer in West Coast hip hop
 Mixmaster Gee, an artist featured on 1987 album Street Sounds Crucial Electro 3
 Alternate name of Black Box (band), an italo-house musical act

Other uses
Mixmaster (Transformers), a Constructicon
Mixmaster universe, a cosmological model proposed by Charles W. Misner
Mixmaster dynamics, the sensitivity of particles permitted to collapse under the force of gravity
 Cicurina mixmaster, a spider in the genus Cicurina
 A complex stack interchange between divided highways